The rue Sainte-Catherine Roundup was a Nazi raid and mass arrest of Jews in Lyon's Sainte-Catherine street by the Gestapo. To catch as many people as possible, the Nazis not only chose the day the Federation normally gave free medical treatment and food to poor Jewish refugees, but they also set up a trap by forcing arrested Federation employees to encourage further people to come to the 12 rue Sainte Catherine.

A total of 86 Jewish people were arrested, 84 of whom were then sent to the Drancy internment camp. Ultimately 83 people were deported to the extermination camps of Sobibor and Auschwitz, and to a lesser extent to Bergen-Belsen, Dachau, and Majdanek. Of those arrested, two escaped before deportation, one was released from Drancy, and only three survived the extermination camps. A number of victims belonged to the French Resistance. The rue Sainte-Catherine Roundup was one of the main charges against Barbie at his trial. Malvine Lanzet, then 14 years old, the prisoner released from Drancy, testified at the trial in 1987. Further written testimonies were given by the few surviving witnesses.

Context 
In 1943, the offices of the fifth chapter of the Union Générale des Israélites de France (UGIF, General union of Israelites of France) were located at 12 Rue Sainte-Catherine in Lyon. Officially, the UGIF was an organisation created by the collaborationist government of Vichy France under the auspices of Nazi Germany. During the war, it was nominally placed under the control of the Commissariat-General for Jewish Affairs.

The UGIF actually acted in secret for the social assistance and welfare of Jewish people, receiving funding from the American Quakers and, as the Nazis believed, from a Geneva-based Jewish society.
The association provided shelter and general help to refugees from all over Europe arriving in Lyon since before the war. The UGIF also provided counterfeit papers and helped smuggle people abroad, in particular to Switzerland. The organisation included a number of non-Jewish helpers as well, who provided temporary housing for some refugees. These activities became known by the Nazis and served as a pretext for the Gestapo to raid the UGIF premises in Lyon, although their actual aim was simply to round up and send as many Jews as possible to the extermination camps.

Roundup

Events
 
On Tuesday, 9 February 1943, the Gestapo, acting under the direction of Klaus Barbie, who was personally present, decided to arrest  the members of the UGIF in Lyon and set up a trap to arrest all people visiting them. They chose a Tuesday because this was the day that the UGIF gave free food and administered medical treatments to the needy.

Gilberte Jacob, one of the few survivors of the roundup reported at the trial of Barbie that she was at her reception desk when, in the early afternoon, three men armed with revolvers arrested her. In total 30 people were present in the UGIF offices when a dozen Gestapo men dressed in plain clothes arrived.
In the following hours, the Gestapo forced the UGIF receptionists to answer calls as usual and to especially encourage people to visit the UGIF that day. Four or five Gestapo members plus Barbie interrogated everybody.
The Gestapo trap worked and soon two rooms were filled with 80 people. The Nazis took all their belongings.

Among the arrested people were Victor Szulklaper and Michel Kroskof-Thomas, who both managed to convince Barbie that they were not Jewish thanks to counterfeit documents. Kroskof-Thomas explained his presence by arguing that he was a painter. After he was let go, he tried to warn as many people as possible not to go to the Union office. In 1983 he provided crucial testimony in which he reported that Barbie was personally present at the UGIF premises on the day of the roundup. In 1985, he also formally identified Barbie in prison. Also initially arrested were Annette Grinszpan and her infant son René Grinszpan, then eight months old. Using counterfeit papers she passed as Alsacian, but ultimately Barbie sent her away because her baby was crying loudly.

On 8 February 1943, Léa Katz-Weiss, then 16 years old, had overheard that a roundup was going to take place in the Grande synagogue de Lyon the next day. Looking for Rabbi Schonberg to warn him, she went to the UGIF offices in the afternoon of the 9th where she was arrested. She managed to convince a Gestapo officer to let her go in exchange for her coming back the next morning to the Hôtel Terminus, so that she could warn her ill mother of her impending departure. Eva Gottlieb, receptionist at the UGIF, used counterfeit papers to claim she was unrelated to the UGIF and was only bringing back a Beethoven music score to a friend, so she was consequently let go. Both Eva Gottlieb and Annette Grinszpan gave written testimonies at the trial of Barbie.

Fate of the prisoners
At the end of the day, the Gestapo had arrested 86 people, of whom 62 were men and 24 women. In the early evening they were forced into two trucks and sent to Fort Lamothe, a military casern that served as a temporary prison as the normal Montluc prison was full. They were left there, crammed into two rooms without food or water for two days under the control of the Wehrmacht. Two people, David Luksemberg and Driller Siegfried, managed to escape during this time in the early morning hours of 11 February 1943.

The 84 prisoners still in German hands were sent by train convoy to the Drancy internment camp, north of Paris. At some point, Malvine Lanzet was released from Drancy, possibly owing to her youth and placed in the care of the UGIF in Paris. The remaining 83 people were deported to the Extermination camps of Sobibor, Auschwitz, Bergen-Belsen and Majdanek. Among these, only three survived.

Victims 

Complete list of people arrested during the Rue Sainte-Catherine Roundup with their age at the time of arrest, given in alphabetical order:

Berthe Ackerman (also Berthe Akierman), 22 years old, murdered in Sobibor.
Bronia Andermann, 36 years old, murdered in Sobibor.
Israël Bach, 54 years old, murdered in Auschwitz.
Simon Badinter, father of the French politician Robert Badinter, 47 years old, murdered in Sobibor.
Leizer Bleiberg (also Bleuberg), 43 years old, murdered in Auschwitz.
Emmanuel Bloch, 68 years old, murdered in Auschwitz.
Isidore Bollack, 72 years old, murdered in Auschwitz
Julius Brender (also Jules Brender), 44 years old, murdered in Sobibor.
Wolf Brull (also Wolf Bruhl), 62 years old, murdered in Auschwitz.
Chuma Czerwonogora (also Chouna Czerwonogora), 32 years old, murdered in Auschwitz.
André Deutsch, 34 years old, was bringing 30,000 Francs to the UGIF for poor refugees which were stolen by the Gestapo. He was murdered in Auschwitz.
Sigmund Dickmann, 33 years old, murdered in Auschwitz.
Noel (also Nathan) Domnicz, 22 years old, murdered in Sobibor.
Gisèle Dornheim (born Gisèle Flesch), 45 years old, murdered in Sobibor.
Emmanuel Edelmann, 35 years old, murdered in Auschwitz.
Albert Engel, 53 years old, murdered in Auschwitz.
Israel Epelbaum, 47 years old, murdered in Sobibor.
Jacob Esskreis, 65 years old, murdered in Auschwitz.
Jacob Ettlinger (ou Jacob Ettinger), 39 years old, murdered in Sobibor.
Salomon Feldhandler, 35 years old, murdered in Sobibor.
Pierre Freidenberg, 42 years old, murdered in Sobibor.
Erna Freund, 54 years old, murdered in Sobibor.
Icek Frydmann, 34 years old, murdered in Majdanek.
Georg Fuchs, 37 years old, murdered in Sobibor.
Osias Fuhrer, 53 years old, murdered in Auschwitz.
Walter Fuhrer, 18 years old, murdered in Auschwitz.
Régine Gattegno, 19 years old, member of the French Resistance, murdered in Sobibor on 30 March 1943.
Kalman Gelber (also Kalmann Gelber), 42 years old, murdered in Auschwitz.
Joseph Goldberg, 40 years old, murdered in Majdanek.
Michel Gorodistan (also Michel Gorodistean), 42 years old, murdered in Auschwitz.
Aurélie Gottlieb, 51 years old, member of the French Resistance, murdered in Auschwitz on 28 June 1943.
Heinrich Grad (also Henri Grad), 44 years old, murdered in Auschwitz.
Esther Grinberg, 32 years old, murdered in Sobibor.
Paul Guerin (also Benno Breslerman), 13 years old, murdered in Sobibor.
Franz Hirschler (also Frantz Hirschler), 52 years old, murdered in Auschwitz.
Isaac Horowicz, 33 years old, murdered in Auschwitz. 
Gilberte Jacob (later Gilberte Lévy), 30 years old, deported to Bergen-Belsen she survived the war and was a witness at the trial of Klaus Barbie.
Ryfka Jelem, 41 years old, murdered in Auschwitz.
Samuel Kohn, 42 years old, member of the French Resistance, murdered in Auschwitz.
Salomon Kruman, 41 years old, murdered in Auschwitz.
Ruchla Landau, 41 years old, murdered in Auschwitz.
Pierre Lanzenberg, 43 years old, dermatologist, member of the French Resistance, murdered in Sobibor.
Anna Lanzet, 43 years old, mother of Malvine Lanzet, murdered in Auschwitz.
Malvine Lanzet (later Malvine Kessler), 14 years old. After she arrived in Drancy, she was released on 12 June 1943 and went to an orphanage in Paris where she was cared for by the Union. She was a witness at the trial of Klaus Barbie.
Annie Lederer, 27 years old, murdered in Sobibor.
Hans Lichtenstein, 41 years old, murdered in Auschwitz.
Sidonie Lichtenstein, 37 years old, murdered in Auschwitz.
Marcelle Loeb, 19 years old, murdered in Sobibor.
Ephraim Loebel (also Ephraim Lobel), 57 years old, murdered in Auschwitz.
Michael Max, 52 years old, murdered in Auschwitz.
Gerson Merker, 54 years old, murdered in Auschwitz.
Norbert Muntzer (or Norbert Munzer), 34 years old, murdered in Auschwitz.
Chaim Peretz, 57 years old, murdered in Auschwitz.
Jacques Peskine, 61 years old, murdered in Auschwitz.
Lola Rappaport (also Loja Rappaport or Laja Rapaport), 21 years old, murdered in Auschwitz.
Klara Reckendorfer, 45 years old, murdered in Auschwitz.
Jean-Jacques (Joseph) Rein, 23 years old, murdered in Sobibor.
Kurt Reis, 42 years old, unknown fate.
Alexandre Reznik, 47 years old, murdered in Auschwitz.
Feiwel Ring, 33 years old, murdered in Auschwitz.
Marcus Rokotnitz (or Marais Rokonitz), 42 years old, murdered in Auschwitz.
Herta Rosenbach, 35 years old, murdered in Auschwitz.
Abraham Rosenberg, 64 years old, murdered in Auschwitz.
Zeli Rosenfeld, 48 years old, unknown fate.
Irma Rosenthal, 64 years old, murdered in Auschwitz.
Henri Rosencweig (also Chemja Rosensweig or Chamja Rosensweig), 25 years old, murdered in Auschwitz.
Menachem Safran, 42 years old, murdered in Auschwitz.
Madeleine Schick, 22 years old, murdered in Sobibor.
Bernard Schneebalg (or Bernard Schnelbalg), 43 years old, murdered in Sobibor.
Simha Schkira, 50 years old, unknown fate.
Joseph Soudakoff (or Joseph Soudrkoff), 52 years old, murdered in Auschwitz.
Betty Steigmann, 36 years old, murdered in Auschwitz.
Armand Steinberg, 32 years old. Dentist, he was deported to Auschwitz and then to the Dachau concentration camp, surviving both ordeals. His testimony was read at the trial of Klaus Barbie. He was interviewed for the documentary Les Témoins impossibles (Impossible witnesses) in 1987.
Jules Steinmuller, 48 years old, murdered in Auschwitz.
Joseph Sztark, 31 years old, murdered in Auschwitz.
Rachmill Szulklaper (also Sullaper), 31 years old, brother of Victor Szulklaper who was released owing to good counterfeit papers in his possession identifying him as a French citizen. Deported to Auschwitz, Rachmill survived the war and died in 1984, on the eve of the trial of Klaus Barbie.
Benno Taubmann, 33 years old, murdered in Sobibor.
Feiwel Taubmann, 60 years old, murdered in Sobibor.
Sally Taubmann, 63 years old, murdered in Sobibor.
Victor Tlagarza (or Victor Tlagarz), 43 years old, murdered in Auschwitz.
Juliette Weill, 21 years old, member of the French Resistance murdered in Sobibor.
Hermann Weinstock, 47 years old, murdered in Auschwitz.
Maier Weismann, 57 years old. The day of the roundup, he was bringing 225,000 Francs in funds from the US to help poor refugees in Lyon. This was stolen by the Gestapo and he was murdered in Sobibor.
Elias Wolf, 65 years old, murdered in Auschwitz.

	 
The four survivors from the 84 arrested were:
Gilberte Jacob, later Gilberte Lévy, witness at the trial of Klaus Barbie;
Malvine Lanzet, later Malvine Kessler, witness at the trial of Klaus Barbie;
Armand Steinberg;
Rachmill Szulklaper.
	 
And the two prisoners who escaped from Fort Lamothe :
Siegfried Driller, born September 16, 1896 in Vienna ;
David Luksemberg (also David Luxembourg).

Legacy 

Following the roundup, the Nazis closed the premises of the UGIF at the Rue Sainte-Catherine. 
In April 1943, the head of the UGIF in Lyon at the time of the roundup, Robert Kahn, was sacked and replaced by Raymond Geissmann.  Geissmann chose new collaborators and relocated the UGIF to the 9 Rue de l'Hôtel de Ville. In spite of this, from then on most of the help to Jewish refugees came from elsewhere, for example from the office of the Rabbi of Lyon as the 5th chapter of the UGIF had been weakened by the roundup.

Barbie's trial 

Thanks to these documents as well as the list of arrivals at the Drancy camp on 12 February 1943, Klarsfeld managed to establish a complete list of names for the 84 victims.

The order signed by Barbie for the roundup was subsequently uncovered, which meant that the events of the Rue Sainte-Catherine were included at the trial of Barbie in 1987. Klarsfeld compiled these documents in the book  (The Rue Sainte-Catherine Roundup in Lyon on 9 February 1943). The roundup of the Rue Sainte-Catherine was therefore instrumental in securing Barbie's life sentence.

Commemorative plaque
On 13 February 2011, on the occasion of the 68th anniversary of the roundup, a commemorative plaque was put in the Rue Sainte-Catherine with the names of the 84 people arrested on the 9th February 1943.
Above the names of the victims, it bears the text:

A yearly commemoration takes place in Lyon in remembrance of the events of 9 February 1943. On the morning of 21 October 2019, the plaque was defaced with half of the names of the victims covered in black ink.

See also
 Union générale des israélites de France

Notes, references and sources

Notes

References

Sources

External links
   - Documentary on Klaus Barbie's activity during the war

The Holocaust in France
War crimes in France
Vichy France
1943 in France
Reparations
February 1943 events
1943 in Judaism